Thomas Rose (1872 – after 1895) was an English footballer who played in the Football League for Nottingham Forest.

References

1872 births
Date of death missing
English footballers
Association football forwards
English Football League players
Heanor Town F.C. players
Nottingham Forest F.C. players